Rhipha flammula is a moth in the family Erebidae. It was described by Kenneth John Hayward in 1947. It is found in Argentina.

References

Moths described in 1947
Phaegopterina